Bernard Francis Meyer, M.M. (June 16, 1891 – May 8, 1975) was an American Catholic missionary. As a member of the Catholic Foreign Mission Society of America (Maryknoll), he was assigned to missions in China.  He served as the Prefect Apostolic of Wuzhou from 1934-1939.

Early life and education
Born in Brooklyn, Iowa, Bernard Meyer's family moved to Stuart, Iowa where he was educated in the local public schools.  After working on the family farm he attended St. Ambrose College in Davenport, Iowa and St. Mary’s Seminary in Baltimore. While he was a student at St. Mary's he wrote to Bishop James Walsh and inquired about Maryknoll. He professed religious vows in 1914 and was ordained a priest on February 12, 1916 by Bishop Austin Dowling of Des Moines.

Priesthood

After ordination Meyer was appointed to the minor seminary faculty at Venard.  The following year he was assigned as one of the first Maryknoll missionaries to South China. He was a delegate to Maryknoll's first General Chapter in 1929 after which he returned to Wuzhou (Wuchow). He was named the superior of the mission on October 30, 1931. On December 10, 1934 Pope Pius XI appointed Meyer as the Prefect Apostolic of Wuzhou. He suffered health problems and he resigned his position on July 20, 1939. As World War II broke out, Meyer was living in Hong Kong and he was interned by the Japanese. He was offered repatriation, but instead chose to take care of the medical and spiritual needs of his fellow prisoners. He returned to the United States as a delegate to the Third General Chapter in 1946. Meyer returned to Guangdong (Canton), but was exiled from China by the Communists in 1950.

Bishop Vincent Waters of the Diocese of Raleigh invited Meyer to promote Catholic Action in his diocese.  Being located in the Southern United States also provided relief from the acute rheumatism he suffered from.

Later life and death
Meyer's health declined during the last ten years of his life.  He moved into the St. Teresa Residence when it opened in 1968.  He died on May 8, 1975 at Phelps Memorial Hospital in North Tarrytown, New York at the age of 83.  Bishop John W. Comber celebrated his funeral on May 12 in the Maryknoll Chapel.

Contribution to Cantonese Learning
Together with Theodore F Wempe, he compiled the Student's Cantonese English Dictionary published in 1934.  Although some  refer to a 'Meyer-Wempe System', there was nothing new in it as their entire schema followed the system devised in the last decade of the 19th century known as Standard Romanization (SR), which, in turn, was almost identical to John Chalmers' system of 1870.

See also

References

1891 births
1975 deaths
People from Poweshiek County, Iowa
St. Ambrose University alumni
Maryknoll Fathers
American Roman Catholic missionaries
Roman Catholic missionaries in China
People from Stuart, Iowa
American expatriates in China
Catholics from Iowa